is a professional Japanese baseball player. He plays pitcher for the Tohoku Rakuten Golden Eagles.

References 

1998 births
Living people
Baseball people from Chiba Prefecture
Waseda University alumni
Japanese baseball players
Nippon Professional Baseball pitchers
Tohoku Rakuten Golden Eagles players